Giuntini Project III is the third album from Italian guitarist Aldo Giuntini's solo band and the second to feature former Black Sabbath singer Tony Martin on vocals.  It was released on 28 April 2006 and was produced by Dario Mollo.

Track listing

Personnel
Band Members
Aldo Giuntini – guitar
Tony Martin – vocals
Fulvio Gaslini – bass
Ezio Secomandi – drums
Dario Patti – keyboards
Fabiano Rizzi – drums on "Memories in the Sand"

Production
Produced, Engineered and Mastered by Dario Mollo
Cover design: Giulio Cataldo
Photography: Emmanuel Mathez

References

Tony Martin (British singer) albums
2006 albums